A broomtail is a horse of the American West that is small and of poor quality.  The term usually also suggests that the horse is untrained or wild.  In some cases, the word is used to describe poor-quality mares, with poor quality male horses then being called "fuzztails."  The term has nothing to do with the quality of a horse's tail.

See also
Cayuse horse
Stock horse
Broomtail wrasse
Broomtail millet
Broomtail grouper,  Mycteroperca xenarcha
Aluterus scriptus, or Broomtail filefish

References

Types of horse